South Floyd High School (SFHS) was a secondary school located in Hi Hat, Floyd County, Kentucky, U.S.A., and was one of five public high schools in the Floyd County School system.

The school closed at the end of the 2016–17 school year. Along with Allen Central High School, it was consolidated into the new Floyd Central High School. The South Floyd campus remains in use as an elementary school, absorbing the current McDowell and Osborne Elementary Schools.

Administration 
South Floyd High School Principal was Mrs. Stacy Shannon South Floyd also had two Assistant Principals. Those two positions were occupied by Mrs. Brooke Moore and Mrs. Cynthia Turner. The Guidance Counselor for the school was Mrs. Beverly Martin. Office staff consisted of Mrs. Debbie Hall and Mrs. Linda Stumbo. South Floyd High Schools Athletic department consisted of Baseball (coach Chad Hall), Basketball (coach Justin Holbrook), Cheerleaders (coach Liz Isaac), Football (coach Chad Hall), Girls Basketball (coach Justin Triplett), Softball (coach Scott Shannon) and Volleyball (coach Kelsey Tackett).

Footnotes

Schools in Floyd County, Kentucky
Public high schools in Kentucky
Educational institutions established in 1993
1993 establishments in Kentucky

2017 disestablishments in Kentucky